The DRG Class 34 refers to:

 Passenger train, tender locomotives with a 2-4-0 wheel arrangement operated by the Deutsche Reichsbahn:
 Class 34.70: BBÖ 231 (locomotive with 0-6-0 wheel arrangement)
 Class 34.73: Mecklenburg P 3.1
 Class 34.76: Saxon III
 Class 34.77–78: Saxon IIIb
 Class 34.79: Saxon IIIb V
 Class 34.80: Saxon VIb V
 Class 34.81: Württemberg A
 Class 34.82: Württemberg Ac